Cyprus participated in the Junior Eurovision Song Contest 2006 which took place in Bucharest, Romania. Luis Panagiotou and Christina Christofi represented the country with the song "Agoria koritsia".

Before Junior Eurovision

National final
The final was held on 30 September 2006. The winner was chosen by a combination of votes from a professional jury (40%) and public televoting (60%). As there was a tie at the end of the voting, the results of the televoting took precedence.

At Junior Eurovision

Voting

Notes

References 

Belgium
2006
Junior Eurovision Song Contest